Jadranka Savić (born 24 November 1972) is a former Yugoslav and Bosnian female basketball player. She represented Bosnia and Herzegovina at the 1999 EuroBasket for Women in Poland.
She played shooting guard for ŽKK Jedinstvo from Tuzla, and between 2005–2006 for French outfit . She currently works at here hometown club ŽKK Jedinstvo as a couch in youth categories.

References

External links
Profile at fiba.com

1972 births
Living people
Bosnia and Herzegovina women's basketball players
ŽKK Jedinstvo Tuzla players